The American Revolution was an 18th-century ideological and political revolution in British America.

American Revolution may also refer to:

 American Revolutionary War, a 1775–1783 military conflict between the United States and Great Britain

Literature
 The American Revolution (Snowden book), a 1796 book by Richard Snowden
 The American Revolution: A Constitutional Interpretation, a 1924 book by Charles Howard McIlwain
 The American Revolution: A Global War, a 1977 book by R. Ernest Dupuy, Gay Hammerman, and Grace P. Hayes

Music
 Thee American Revolution, an American rock band formed in 2004
 The American Revolution (album), a 1970 album by David Peel and the Lower East Side

Television
 The American Revolution (2006 miniseries), or The Revolution, an American documentary series on The History Channel
 The American Revolution (2014 miniseries), an American documentary series on the American Heroes Channel

Other uses
 The American Revolution: 1775–1783, a 1972 board wargame
 "An American Revolution", a 2004–2009 Chevrolet advertising campaign
 An American Revolution 150, later the Kevin Whitaker Chevrolet 150, a NASCAR race

See also
 American Revolution 2, a 1969 documentary film about the 1968 U.S. Democratic National Convention
 WBCN and the American Revolution, a 2012 documentary film about a Boston radio station
 Latin American revolutions (disambiguation)
 :Category:Rebellions in North America
 :Category:Rebellions in South America